Gibbonsia metzi, the striped kelpfish, is a species of clinid native to the Pacific coast of North America from British Columbia, Canada, to Baja California, Mexico. This species can reach a maximum length of  TL. The can also be found in the aquarium trade. This species feeds primarily on polychaete worms. The specific name honours the geneticist Charles W. Metz (1889-1975) of the University of Pennsylvania.

References

metzi
Fish described in 1927